Mereni is a commune in Teleorman County, Muntenia, Romania. It is composed of three villages: Merenii de Jos (the commune center), Merenii de Sus and Ștefeni.

References

Communes in Teleorman County
Localities in Muntenia